Suzanne Fink (born as Suzanne Koch, also known as Suzanne Fink-Koch) is a former German curler and curling coach.

She is a former World champion and two-time . She competed at the 1988 Winter Olympics when curling was a demonstration sport.

Teams

Women's

Mixed

Record as a coach of national teams

References

External links
 

German female curlers
Curlers at the 1988 Winter Olympics
Olympic curlers of Germany
World curling champions
European curling champions
German curling champions
German curling coaches
1957 births
Living people